The 1961 Cork Senior Football Championship was the 73rd staging of the Cork Senior Football Championship since its establishment by the Cork County Board in 1887. 

University College Cork entered the championship as the defending champions.

On 1 October 1961, Avondhu won the championship following a 1-07 to 1-05 defeat of Clonakilty in the final. It remains their only championship title.

Results

Final

Miscellaneous

 Avondhu win their first title. They are also the first divisional side to win titles in both codes.
 Avondhu miss out on the double after they lost out in the hurling final

References

Cork Senior Football Championship